Dakamavand may refer to:

Dakamavand-e Olya
Dakamavand-e Sofla